Semen Danilov (also Semyon Danilov, ; born September 20, 1986) is a Kyrgyz former swimmer, who specialized in sprint freestyle events. Danilov qualified for the men's 50 m freestyle at the 2004 Summer Olympics in Athens, by clearing a FINA B-standard entry time of 23.29 from the Kazakhstan Open Championships in Almaty. He challenged seven other swimmers in heat five, including four-time Olympian Carl Probert of Fiji. He rounded out the field to last place in 26.61, more than three seconds off his entry time. Danilov failed to advance into the semifinals, as he shared a sixty-sixth place tie with Albania's Kreshnik Gjata in the preliminaries.

References

External links
 

1986 births
Living people
Kyrgyzstani male freestyle swimmers
Olympic swimmers of Kyrgyzstan
Swimmers at the 2004 Summer Olympics
Sportspeople from Bishkek
Kyrgyzstani people of Russian descent